Hülya Esen, Хюлия Велиева (born 7 August 1989) is a Turkish born professional tennis player. She was seven consecutive years number one in Bulgarian women's ranking. Her parents are with Turkish origin from Kardzhali, Bulgaria, and her ancestors came from Konya. Her mother Nebahat is from Ardino, and has been her coach, managing her and her sister Lütfiye Esen careers.
Together with her sister Lütfiye, they are 12 times women's doubles champions of Bulgaria. Hülya is in total 17 times champion of Bulgaria, in singles, doubles, and mixed doubles. She is the first and was the only triple champion of Bulgaria (till 2021), that have won all singles, doubles and mixed doubles competitions in one championship.

In her career, Esen won six ITF doubles titles. She has career-high WTA rankings of 504 in singles, achieved on 9 July 2012, and 406 in doubles, reached on 11 November 2013. She played her last match on the ITF Circuit in October 2018.

Esen made her WTA Tour main-draw debut at the 2008 Gastein Ladies in the doubles event, partnering Stefanie Haidner. She also played in the doubles event of the 2010 İstanbul Cup, partnering Derya Turhan.

ITF Circuit finals

Singles: 2 (2 runner–ups)

Doubles: 18 (6 titles, 12 runner–ups)

ITF Junior finals

Singles: 3 (3 runner–ups)

Doubles: 4 (4 titles)

References

External links

 
 

1989 births
Living people
Turkish female tennis players
Bulgarian female tennis players
Turkish twins
Twin sportspeople
21st-century Turkish sportswomen